Charles H. Best Middle School is a middle school in North York, Ontario for Grade 4 to 8 students. It is located near Dufferin Street and Finch Avenue, in the Bathurst Manor residential area. The school was named Dufferin Heights Junior High until 1978, when it was renamed in honour of Charles Best, one of the co-discoverers of insulin.

Specialized Programs 
C.H. Best MS is known for its CyberARTS program, a multi-disciplinary program for grade 7 and 8 students integrating technology and multi-media. The school also has several specialized classes including Learning Disabilities and Resource (HSP) classes, a Developmental Delay class, and an Intermediate Autism class.

External links

Toronto District School Board: Charles H. Best Middle School with a school profile (.pdf)
 Charles H. Best MS CyberARTS

Middle schools in Toronto
North York